William Frederick "Heinie" Heitmuller (May 25, 1883 – October 8, 1912) was an American left fielder in Major League Baseball. He was born in San Francisco, California, and died at age 29 in Los Angeles. He was buried at Olivet Memorial Park in Colma, California.

Playing career
After attending the University of California, Berkeley, Heitmuller played for several years in the Pacific Coast League. He then spent part of two seasons in the outfield for the Philadelphia Athletics. In 1909, he played in 64 games and hit well. However, his averages dropped in 1910, and he lost the left field job to Topsy Hartsel. Overall, Heitmuller played in 95 major league games, 89 as an outfielder and 69 in left field. He had a career batting average of .271 with a .368 on-base percentage.

After being released by the Athletics in July, Heitmuller played in the Eastern League and then returned to the Pacific Coast League. Near the end of the 1912 season, Heitmuller was playing for the PCL Los Angeles Angels and was leading the league with a .347 batting average when he was stricken with typhoid fever. He appeared to be having a season that could propel him back to the major leagues, but he died of the fever on October 8, 1912.

Nickname
"Heinie" was a popular nickname for German baseball players in the early 1900s. Heitmuller was one of 22 major league Heinies in the first half of the 20th century. No Major League ballplayer has gone by the nickname "Heinie" since the end of World War II.

References

External links

Baseball Almanac

1883 births
1912 deaths
Major League Baseball left fielders
Philadelphia Athletics players
Oakland Oaks (baseball) players
Baseball players from California
University of California, Berkeley alumni
California Golden Bears baseball players
Deaths from typhoid fever